Melissa (Greek: Μέλισσα meaning "bee", before 1957: Καστράκι - Kastraki) is a village in the municipal unit of Lechaina in Elis, Greece. In 2001 its population was 328.  Its elevation is 100 m. The village is situated on a low hill, 10 km east of Lechaina proper, on the road to Borsi. The village has a school and a church named Agios Tryphonas.

Historical population

See also

List of settlements in Elis

External links
GTP - Melissa

References 

Lechaina
Populated places in Elis